The 2021 Allen Crowe 100 was the 15th stock car race of the 2021 ARCA Menards Series season, and the 39th iteration of the event. The race was held on Sunday, August 22, in Springfield, Illinois at the Illinois State Fairgrounds Racetrack, a  permanent clay oval-shaped track at the Illinois State Fair. The race took the scheduled 100 laps to complete. At race's end, Corey Heim of Venturini Motorsports would dominate the race to win his seventh career ARCA Menards Series win and the sixth of the season. To fill out the podium, Ty Gibbs of Joe Gibbs Racing and Taylor Gray of David Gilliland Racing would finish second and third respectively.

Background 
Illinois State Fairgrounds Racetrack is a one mile long clay oval motor racetrack on the Illinois State Fairgrounds in Springfield, the state capital. It is frequently nicknamed The Springfield Mile. Constructed in the late 19th century and reconstructed in 1927, the track has hosted competitive auto racing since 1910, making it one of the oldest speedways in the United States. The original mile track utilized the current frontstretch and the other side was behind the current grandstands and the straightaways were connected by tight turns. It is the oldest track to continually host national championship dirt track racing, holding its first national championship race in 1934 under the American Automobile Association banner. It is the home of five world records for automobile racing, making it one of the fastest dirt tracks in the world. Since 1993, the venue is managed by Bob Sargent's Track Enterprises.

Entry list

Practice 
The only 30-minute practice session was held on Sunday, August 22, at 10:00 AM CST.

Qualifying 
Qualifying would take place on Sunday, August 22, at 11:30 AM CST. Each driver would have one lap to set a time.

No drivers would fail to qualify.

Race results

References 

2021 ARCA Menards Series
Allen Crowe 100
Allen Crowe 100